Aagaardia longicalcis is a species of fly discovered by Ole Anton Sæther in 2000. No sub-species specified in Catalogue of Life.

References

Chironomidae
Insects described in 2000